Suzuki on Science is a Canadian science information television series which aired on CBC Television from 1971 to 1972.

Premise
This marked the debut of University of British Columbia science professor David Suzuki as a television series host and launched his career as a Canadian scientific broadcaster. This series on scientific subjects was produced by CBC Vancouver, with the initial pilot episodes reflecting Suzuki's specialty of genetics. Later episodes concerned other areas of science.

Scheduling
This half-hour series began with a pilot run on Sundays at 2:00 p.m. (Eastern time) from 10 January to 14 February 1971. Another run was broadcast in the same time slot from 28 March to 27 June 1971. It continued in a Monday 10:00 p.m. time slot from 12 July to 20 September 1971. The final series run returned to its original Sunday afternoon time slot from 9 January to 26 March 1972.

References

External links
 

CBC Television original programming
1971 Canadian television series debuts
1972 Canadian television series endings